Scintilla is a free, open source library that provides a text editing component function, with an emphasis on advanced features for source code editing.

Features
Scintilla supports many features to make code editing easier in addition to syntax highlighting. The highlighting method allows the use of different fonts, colors, styles and background colors, and is not limited to fixed-width fonts. The control supports error indicators, line numbering in the margin, as well as line markers such as code breakpoints. Other features such as code folding and autocompletion can be added. The basic regular expression search implementation is rudimentary, but if compiled with C++11 support Scintilla can support the runtime's regular expression engine. Scintilla's regular expression library can also be replaced or avoided with direct buffer access.  

Currently, Scintilla has experimental support for right-to-left languages. 

Scinterm is a version of Scintilla for the curses text user interface. It is written by the developer of the Textadept editor. Scinterm uses Unicode characters to support some of Scintilla's graphically oriented features, but some Scintilla features are missing because of the terminal environment's constraints.

Other versions
 ScintillaNET – a wrapper for use on the .NET Framework
 QScintilla – Qt port of Scintilla
 wxScintilla – wxWidgets-wrapper for Scintilla
 wxStyledTextCtrl – class acting as a wrapper for Scintilla in the wxWidgets toolkit
 CsScintilla - CopperSpice port of Scintilla
 Delphi wrappers:
 TScintEdit – part of Inno Setup.
 TDScintilla – simple wrapper for all methods of Scintilla.
 TScintilla – Delphi Scintilla Interface Component (as of 2009-09-02, this project is no longer under active development).

Software based on Scintilla
Notable software based on Scintilla includes:

References

External links

Free computer libraries
 
Software that uses GTK